Parthenina sarsi is a species of sea snail, a marine gastropod mollusk in the family Pyramidellidae, the pyrams and their allies. The species is one of a number within the genus Parthenina.

Distribution
This species occurs in the following locations:
 Belgian Exclusive Economic Zone
 European waters (ERMS scope)
 Goote Bank
 United Kingdom Exclusive Economic Zone
 Wimereux

References

External links
 To CLEMAM
 To Encyclopedia of Life
 To Marine Species Identification Portal
 To World Register of Marine Species

Pyramidellidae
Molluscs of the Atlantic Ocean
Invertebrates of the North Sea
Gastropods described in 1972